was a Japanese special effects director.

Early life 
His father worked for an affiliate of South Manchuria Railway called International Transport. His childhood was characterized by wealth, and he attended Andō Yamato Arimichi National Elementary School. His family was transported to Niihama, Ehime, Japan after Japan's defeat in 1945, where he graduated elementary school before moving to Kyoto two years later.

Career

Filmography

Film and television

References

External links 
https://www.tohokingdom.com/people/teruyoshi_nakano.html
 Milner, David. Yoshihiko Shibata (trans.) July 1994. "An Interview with Teruyoshi Nakano", Kaiju Fan Online.

1935 births
2022 deaths
Japanese people from Manchukuo
Japanese film directors
Special effects coordinators
Nihon University alumni